Kungursky Uyezd was an administrative division of Perm Governorate, Russian Empire, which existed in 1781-1921. Its administrative center was the town of Kungur. Area: 11,372.6 km².

Demographics
At the time of the Russian Empire Census of 1897, Kungursky Uyezd had a population of 136,343. Of these, 96.6% spoke Russian, 2.0% Tatar, 0.5% Komi-Zyrian, 0.4% Bashkir, 0.2% Mari, 0.1% Mansi and 0.1% Yiddish as their native language.

References

Sources
Brockhaus and Efron Encyclopedic Dictionary

 
1781 establishments in the Russian Empire
1921 disestablishments in Russia
Uezds of Perm Governorate
History of Perm Krai